Kelli L. Stavast is an American sportscaster who works for NBC Sports as a pit reporter for both their NASCAR (in both the Cup and Xfinity Series) and IndyCar Series coverage. She has reported for numerous other forms of motorsports throughout her career, as well as diving at the 2016 Summer Olympics in Rio de Janeiro and freestyle skiing at the 2018 Winter Olympics in Pyongchang.

Early life and education
Stavast was raised in Denver, Colorado. She attended Chapman University where she graduated in 2002 with a broadcast journalism degree.

Career

In 2015, Stavast joined NBC's returning NASCAR coverage as a pit reporter. She was announced to be joining the broadcast team on January 22, 2014, along with Marty Snider. They would be joined by Dave Burns and Mike Massaro (announced later in the year) as NBC's four pit reporters for the NASCAR Cup and Xfinity Series. Stavast was the only original member of the NBC broadcast team hired without a prior experience covering NASCAR, although she did report for other forms of motorsports for NBC, Speed, and ESPN including the Grand-Am, American Le Mans Series (and those two series when they merged to become IMSA), Stadium Super Truck Series, and Lucas Oil Off Road Racing Series.

She was also a reporter for NBC coverage of diving at the 2016 Summer Olympics in Rio de Janeiro, as well as freestyle skiing at the 2018 Winter Olympics in Pyongchang. Stavast interviewed skier Madison Olsen.

On October 2, 2021, Stavast interviewed Brandon Brown after his victory at the Xfinity Series' Sparks 300, while the crowd was chanting, "F*** Joe Biden" in the background. Stavast misquoted the chant as, "Let's Go Brandon." It is unclear whether she legitimately misheard the chant or whether she intentionally misquoted it. After footage of the interview went viral, the phrase "Let's Go Brandon" became a political slogan and a meme to mock president Joe Biden as a minced oath. She hasn’t appeared in any NBC Sports broadcasts ever since and it is currently unknown if Stavast was sidelined or is no longer with the network.

Personal life 
Stavast moved to Las Vegas where her then-fiancé Gavin Kelly also an American sportscaster who works for the NBC Sports, NASCAR, and IndyCar Series was living, when they got engaged in 2016. The couple were introduced to each other through Kurt Busch, who is a close friend of Gavin's.

References

External links
 Kelli Stavast NBC bio (NASCAR)
 Kelli Stavast NBC bio (Olympics)
 

1980 births
American television reporters and correspondents
American television sports announcers
Chapman University alumni
Living people
Motorsport announcers
NASCAR people
People from Colorado
People from Las Vegas